Anydrelia is a genus of moths in the family Geometridae.

Species
Anydrelia dharmsalae (Butler, 1883)
Anydrelia distorta (Hampson, 1895)
Anydrelia plicataria (Leech, 1897)

References

Asthenini
Geometridae genera